This is a comprehensive listing of official solo releases by Robbie Robertson, former lead guitarist and singer of The Band.

Albums

Studio albums

Soundtrack albums

Compilation albums

Singles

Promotional singles

Guest singles

Other appearances

Producer

Albums

Soundtracks

Music videos

See also
 The Band
 The Band discography

References

External links
 

Robbie Robertson
Discographies of American artists
Rock music discographies